Faith of Our Fathers (subtitled Classic Religious Anthems of Ireland) is a compilation album of traditional Catholic/Christian English, Irish, and Latin hymns recorded by Irish artists in 1996.

The album topped the Irish Albums Chart for two months, broke release records, and was certified fifteen times-platinum. The nineteenth-century hymn "Faith of Our Fathers" is the title track.

Origins
The album was the idea of a broker, John Kearns, working for Hibernian Insurance. Funding included contributions from his coworkers. Several labels turned Kearns down before Lunar records agreed to produce the album.

Artists
The album was produced by Bill Somerville-Large and overseen by musical director John Tate. Tenor Frank Patterson, soprano Regina Nathan, the Monks of Glenstal Abbey, youth choir RTÉ Cór na nÓg, and the RTÉ Philharmonic Choir made contributions to the album. It was recorded over five sessions in venues that included the Aula Maxima at Maynooth College in County Kildare and Glenstal Abbey in County Limerick.

Track listing
Holy God, We Praise Thy Name
Sweet Heart of Jesus
Hail Redeemer, King Divine
Salve Regina
Faith of Our Fathers
The Bells of Angelus
To Jesus, Heart All Burning
Tantum Ergo
Soul of My Savior
Céad Míle Fáilte Romhat, A Íosa
Queen of the May
O Sacrament Most Holy
Lord of All Hopefulness
Ave Verum
Hail Glorious Saint Patrick
I'll Sing a Hymn to Mary
Hail Queen of Heaven, the Ocean Star
Jesus My Lord, My God, My All
We Stand for God

Legacy
With sales of over 150,000 copies, the album was the biggest-selling release in Ireland in 1996, and it became Ireland's biggest-selling album of all-time by 1998. It launched the recording career of Monks of Glenstal Abbey. Peter Lennon compared its popularity to that of Riverdance. The success of the record led the album's promoters to arrange concert performances in the Dublin's Point Depot and New York City's Carnegie Hall. 

A Faith of Our Fathers II album was released in 1997, which inspired the name of Dustin the Turkey's Christmas album Faith of Our Feathers.

References

External links
 

1996 compilation albums
Compilation albums by Irish artists
Catholic music